Bruce William Davidson (born 15 March 1951) is a former Australian politician. He was the Liberal member for Noosa in the Legislative Assembly of Queensland from 1992 to 2001.

Davidson was born in Leeton, New South Wales, and was a retailer and restaurateur before entering politics. Elected as Noosa's first MP in 1992, he was Shadow Minister for Tourism, Consumer Affairs and Regional Development from 1995 to 1996, and served as the minister during the Borbidge Government from 1996 to 1998. Following the formation of the Beattie Government in 1998, he became Shadow Minister for Fair Trading and Consumer Affairs, serving until 2000. In 2001 he was defeated by Labor candidate Cate Molloy.

References

1951 births
Living people
Liberal Party of Australia members of the Parliament of Queensland
Members of the Queensland Legislative Assembly
21st-century Australian politicians